Malleswaran Mudi (മല്ലേശ്വരന്‍ മുടി) is the highest peak in the Attappadi Forest Reserve in Mannarkad Taluk, Palakkad district, Kerala, India at an elevation of 1,664 meters. It is located at the Agali Hills (അഗളി മലനിരകള്‍) range in the Western Ghats.

Mahashivarathri is celebrated at the malleswaran temple. These peak is worshipped as a big shiva lingam by the tribals with great devotion. 

Mountains of Kerala
Geography of Palakkad district